The Indian Institute of Natural Resins and Gums (acronym IINRG), formerly known as the Indian Lac Research Institute, is an autonomous institute, established under the umbrella of Indian Council of Agricultural Research (ICAR) by the Ministry of Agriculture, Government of India for advanced research on lac and other natural resins and gums. The Institute is located at Namkum, Ranchi in Jharkhand, India.

Profile 

The Indian Institute of Natural Resins and Gums (IINRG) was originally established as Indian Lac Research Institute (ILRI) for acting as a nodal agency for the research and development of lac and other natural resins and gums on 20 September 1924. The Institute was mandated to focus its attention on crop harvesting and tapping, produce processing, development of products, training, information repository, technology dissemination and liaison with other national and international agencies.

IINRG owes its origin to the recommendations of Lindsay- Harlow Committee, appointed by the erstwhile Imperial Government of India, in 1920, to study the various aspects of lac in the country. On the suggestions of the Committee, Indian Lac Association for Research, a consortium of lac merchants in India was formed. The Indian Lac Research Institute was started by the Association on 20 September 1920. In 1931, the institute was moved under a newly constituted Indian Lac Cess Committee (ILCC).

Later, when the Indian Lac Cess Committee (ILCC) was formed as per the findings and recommendations of the Royal Commission on Agriculture, the institute was transferred to ILCC on 1 August 1931. ILCC was given the control of the London Shellac Research Bureau, UK and Shellac Research Bureau and Polytechnique Institute of Brooklyn, USA as well.

The status remained in the post-independence India till 1966 when the Indian Council of Agricultural Research took over the reins of the Institute on 1 April 1966, becoming one of the earlier institutes under ICAR umbrella. On 20 September 2007, the institute was renamed as the Indian Institute of Natural Resins and Gums (IINRG) and was given an expanded mandate to cover all the natural resins and gums of Indian origin.

Divisions

The activities of the Institute is primarily handled by three divisions, each entrusted with specific tasks.

Lac Production Division

LPD is involved in the research on improvement of production technologies of lac for which it focuses on the improvement of host plants and insects. It maintains a Lac Host and Lac Gene Bank and a biotechnology laboratory specifically for this purpose. Lac insect genetic stocks and host plant germplasms are characterized so that the ideal insect/host plant combination may be selected for developing effective production technologies.

Process and Product Development Division

PPD Division is a later entrant into IINRG and is engaged in the research of processing and value addition processes of natural resins and gums. It attends to the various stages of value addition at the raw, semi-finished and finished natural resins and gums and is an accredited laboratory for the collection, analysis, testing and reporting of lac and lac based products. The Division is ISO-9001 certified and hosts a Processing and Demonstrating Unit with pilot plants for research, refinement, training and demonstration, aimed at entrepreneurial requirements.

Transfer of Technology Division

The Transfer of Technology division is the knowledge bank of IINRG and is responsible for the assessment, refinement and dissemination of the research knowledge as well as imparting training to the farmers and other interested parties on the subject. It also maintains a Lac Museum, displaying a comprehensive range of exhibits ranging from samples from different parts of the world, various technologies, uses of lac in industries such as cosmetics, wool dyeing, medicines and jewellery making.

Facilities
IINRG maintains advanced facilities for the research such as:
Biotechnology lab: Undertakes research and testing work on molecular and plant tissue culture and imparts training to scientists and students.
Field Gene Bank: A repository for germplasm which has been recognised by National Bureau of Plant Genetics Resources as National Active Germplasm Site.

IINRG also has a modern conference hall for conferences, seminars and training sessions.

Projects
IINRG is involved in many core in-house projects such as Productivity and Quality Improvement, Crop Production System Management, Processing, Storage and Quality Management, Value Addition, Application Development and Product Diversification, Capacity Building of Farmers and Entrepreneurship Development and Technology Evaluation, Refinement, Dissemination and Demonstration and a set of NAIP projects such as:
 To understand the nature of diversity in lac insects of Kerria spp. in India and the nature of insect x host interaction (NAIP- Component -4 )
 A value chain on lac and lac based products for domestic and export markets. (NAIP- Component -2)
 Developing sustainable framing models for prioritized micro water shed in rainfed area in Jharkhand with BAU, Ranchi. (NAIP Component-3)
 
The externally funded projects at IINRG are:
 Production of summer kusmi broodlac on kusum for promotion of lac cultivation in Gujarat with farmer's participation. (Forest Department, Silva Division, Gujarat)
 Climate change and lac crop performance
 Lac cultivation and processing unit establishment. 
 FQ 3029 (NFBSFARA sponsored)
 Jute based bio-composites for industry

National Network Project
IINRG is the Lead Coordinating Centre among 7 centres, for the National network Project for Harvesting, Processing and Value Addition of Natural Resins and Gums. The main objects of research are rosins (Pinus roxburghii), guar gum (Cyamopsis tetragonoloba), karaya gum (Sterculia urens), gum Arabic (Acacia Senegal) and guggul (Commiphora mukul). It is also involved in the preparation of agroforestry models on resins and gums.

Publications

IINRG has brought out several publications of which some of the notable ones are:
 
 
 
 
 
 
 
 
 
 
 
 
 
 
 
 
 
 
 
 
 
 
 

Ebooks on Natural Resins & Gums
 Natural Resins & Gums of commercial importance - At a glance
 Descriptors of lac insect with special reference to Kerria Spp.
 Lac Culture Operations
 Physico-chemical properties of some Indian plant gums of commercial importance

See also

 Agroecological restoration
 Agroecosystem
 Agroecosystem analysis
 Ecology
 Organic agriculture

References

External links
 on ICAR web site
 on YouTube
 on ASTI
 on Jharkhand Blog
 on Research Gate

Agroecology
Agricultural research institutes in India
Research institutes in Jharkhand
Indian Council of Agricultural Research
Forestry research
Forestry in India
1924 establishments in India